The National Telecommunications Commission (NTC) is an attached agency of the Department of Information and Communications Technology responsible for the supervision, adjudication and control over all telecommunications services and television and radio networks throughout the Philippines.

History
The National Telecommunications Commission (NTC) was created under Executive Order No. 546 promulgated on July 23, 1979, and conferred with regulatory and quasi-judicial functions taken over from the Board of Communications and the Telecommunications Control Bureau, which were abolished in the same Order.

Primarily, the NTC is the sole body that exercises jurisdiction over the supervision, adjudication and control over all telecommunications services and television networks throughout the country. For the effective enforcement of this responsibility, it adopts and promotes guidelines, rules, and regulations on the establishment, operation, and maintenance of various telecommunications facilities and services nationwide.

Although independent as its regulatory and quasi-judicial functions are concerned, the NTC remains under the administrative supervision of the Department of Information and Communication Technology as an attached agency. However, with respect to its quasi-judicial functions, NTC's decisions are appealable only and directly to the Supreme Court of the Philippines.

Timeline

 1927: Act No. 3396 known as the Ship Radio Station Law was enacted. The Radio Construction and Maintenance Section, the first radio regulatory office was charged to enforce the said law.
 1931: Act No. 3846 known as the Radio Control Law was enacted. The Radio Control Division in the Bureau of Post was created under the jurisdiction of the then Secretary of Commerce and Communications.
 1939: The Radio Control Division was transferred to the Department of National Defense which was organized pursuant to Executive Order No. 230.
 1947: The Radio Control Division was again transferred to the Department of Commerce and Industry which was created pursuant to Executive Order No. 230.
 1951: Republic Act 1476 was enacted abolishing the Radio Control Board.
 1962: Department Order 51 was issued changing the name of the Radio Control Division to the Radio Control Office.
 1972: The Board of Communications (BOC) was created under the Integrated Reorganization Law. It was the first quasi-judicial body with adjudicatory powers on matters involving telecommunications services.
 1974: The Radio Control Office was renamed the Telecommunications Control Bureau.
 1979: By virtue of Executive Order 546, the TCB and the BOC were integrated into a single entity now known as the National Telecommunications Commission. The Ministry of Transportation and Communications, which was created under the same Order has administrative jurisdiction over the NTC.
 1987: President Corazon Aquino issued Executive Order 125-A making the NTC an attached agency of the Department of Transportation and Communications (DOTC).
 2004: President Gloria Macapagal-Arroyo issued Executive Order 269 creating the Commission on Information and Communications Technology (CICT) and transferring the NTC from the DOTC to the CICT.
 2005: President Gloria Macapagal-Arroyo issued Executive Order 454 transferring the NTC back to the DOTC.
 2008: President Gloria Macapagal-Arroyo issued Executive Order 648 transferring the NTC back to the CICT.
 2011: President Benigno S. Aquino III issued Executive Order No. 47 (June 23, 2011) which retains the NTC under the Office of the President as part of the Other Executive Offices (OEO)
 2016: President Benigno S. Aquino III signed Republic Act No. 10844 creating the Department of Information and Communications Technology (DICT) and making the NTC an attached agency of the newly created executive department.

Effectiveness
The National Telecommunications Commission has been "hands off" since 1995 with the passage of Republic Act No. 7925 which has effectively deregulated and privatized the telecom industry. It is argued, that the "hands off" approach resulted in the Philippines having one of the slowest Internet in Asia. The NTC itself stated the said law is the "reason why the government has difficulty in regulating internet service today."

Head
The NTC is headed by a commissioner appointed by the President.

List of commissioners

See also
Department of Information and Communications Technology
ABS-CBN franchise renewal controversy

References

External links

Philippines
Telecom
Regulation in the Philippines
Government agencies established in 1979
1979 establishments in the Philippines
Establishments by Philippine executive order